Tyrus may refer to:

People:
 Ty Cobb (1886-1961), American Hall-of-Fame Major League Baseball player
 Tyrus McCloud (born 1974), American former National Football League player
 Tyrus McGee (born 1991), American basketball player in the Israel Basketball Premier League
 Tyrus Thomas (born 1986), American retired National Basketball Association player
 Tyrus Thompson (born 1991), American National Football League player
 Ty Treadway (born 1967), American television host
 Tyrus Wong (1910-2016), Chinese-born American artist and Disney illustrator
 Tyrus (wrestler) (born 1973), American professional wrestler and Fox News contributor

Other uses:
 Tyrus (Phoenicia), Latin name of the ancient Phoenician city of Tyre
 Tyrus (beetle), a genus of ant-loving beetles
 Tyrus, a European strategy game
 Tyrus Kitt, a fictional character on the television series Breaking Bad and Better Call Saul
 Tyrus, the planet from which the aliens come in the 1988 American miniseries Invasion America
 Tyrus (film), a documentary about Tyrus Wong

Masculine given names